Sophie and the Rising Sun is a 2016 American drama film written and directed by Maggie Greenwald. It is based on the 2001 novel Sophie and the Rising Sun by Augusta Trobaugh. The film stars Julianne Nicholson, Takashi Yamaguchi, Margo Martindale, Diane Ladd, Lorraine Toussaint and Karen Wheeling Reynolds. It was released in theaters on January 25, 2017 by Monterey Media.

Plot
Set in the autumn of 1941 in Salty Creek, a willowy fishing village in South Carolina, the film tells the compelling story of two interracial lovers, Sophie, an artist who also fishes and sells crabs to the townsfolk, the other an Asian gentleman, swept up in the tides of history. As World War II rages in Europe, Mr. Ohta appears in the town badly beaten and under mysterious circumstances. Sophie, a native of Salty Creek, quickly becomes transfixed by Mr. Ohta and a friendship born of their mutual love of art blossoms into a delicate and forbidden courtship. As their secret relationship evolves the war escalates tragically. And when Pearl Harbor is bombed, a surge of misguided patriotism, bigotry and violence sweeps through the town, threatening Mr. Ohta's life. A trio of women, each with her own secrets – Sophie, along with the town matriarch and her housekeeper – rejects law and propriety, risking their lives with their actions.

Cast
Julianne Nicholson as Sophie Willis
Takashi Yamaguchi as Grover Ohta
Margo Martindale as Anne Morrison
Diane Ladd as Ruth Jeffers
Lorraine Toussaint as Salome Whitmore
Karen Wheeling Reynolds as Isabel
Mickey Dodge as Samille
Don Henderson Baker as Dr. Gilbert
Joel Murray as Sheriff Cooper
David Dickson Reynolds as Reverend Jeffers
Kenneth Charles Graham as Harold Jackson
Sabrina Mayfield as Matilda
Jan Hartsell as Minna
Cali Ward as Young Sophie
Ebony McCormick as Young Salome
Meredith Jackson as Young Ruth
Antonio Roberts as Zachary
Colie McClellan as Young Anne
Ben VanderMey as Soldier
Harrison Shaw as Young Johnny

Release
The film premiered at the 2016 Sundance Film Festival on January 22, 2016. The film was released on January 25, 2017.

Critical Response 
On review aggregator website Rotten Tomatoes, the film has an approval rating of 64% based on 11 reviews and an average rating of 4.5/10. As of September, 2019, There is no critical consensus yet. On Metacritic, the film has a score of 55 out of 100 based on 5 critics, indicating "mixed or average reviews".

References

External links
 

2016 films
2016 drama films
2010s English-language films
American drama films
Films about interracial romance
Films based on American novels
Films based on romance novels
Films directed by Maggie Greenwald
Films scored by David Mansfield
Films set in South Carolina
2010s American films